There are almost 200 large dams in Myanmar. Total installed capacity in 2010 is at least  MW, 6% of potential. Several large dams are planned to increase future hydro utilization.

Background
Although Myanmar is underdeveloped in terms of its hydro-power potential it is not for lack of effort. While chairman of the State Peace and Development Council,  Sr-Gen Than Shwe prioritized the building of dams. A native of the Kyaukse region through which the Zawgyi River flows, Shwe was widely rumored to believe himself to be a reincarnation of King Anawrahta (r. 1044-1077). During his reign King Anawrahta was a prolific dam- and canal-builder, especially along the Zawgyi river. He viewed his hydro projects as atonement for killing his foster-brother Sokkate.

Myanmar's hydro power development activities and plans include five-year short-term plans and a 30-year strategic plan. This involves generating power for domestic use and exporting to neighboring countries, especially China, Thailand and India. Total planned hydro power development in Myanmar is 14,600 MW.

Though the twelve large planned hydroelectric dams generating more than 1,000 MW gain much media attention, there are at least another twelve in the 100 - 1000 MW range and at least 27 smaller microhydroprojects less than 100 MW. The rest of the dams are generally lower-height irrigation structures.

At least 45 Chinese multinational corporations have been involved in approximately 63 hydropower projects in Myanmar, including several related substation and transmission line projects. The country's State Peace and Development Council Chairman Than Shwe met with Chinese representatives at the Shweli I Dam.

The Asian Development Bank’s October 2012 assessment of the energy sector in Myanmar reported on the country's abundant hydropower potential, with 92 potential large hydropower projects already identified.

Major dams

Salween river

Seven dams have been proposed for the Salween River. The largest of these hydro power projects is the  Tasang Dam on the Salween River, which is to be integrated into the Asian Development Bank’s Greater Mekong Sub-region Power Grid. A groundbreaking ceremony for the Tasang Dam was held in March 2007, and China Gezhouba Group Co. (CGGC) started preliminary construction shortly after. China's involvement in the damming of the Salween River is not limited to the Tasang project.

In 2006, the government signed a Memorandum of Understanding (MoU) with Sinohydro for the US$1 billion, 1,200 MW Hat Gyi Dam along the Thai border. In April 2007, Farsighted Group (now known as Hanergy) and China Gold Water Resources Co. signed MoUs for an additional 2,400 MW hydropower project on the upper Salween, an area which Yunnan Power Grid Co. reportedly surveyed in 2006.

In April 2008, Sinohydro, China Southern Power Grid Co., and China Three Gorges Project Co. signed a strategic cooperation framework agreement for the development of the hydro power potential of the Salween River. Despite China's involvement in these large-scale dams on the Salween, most of the electricity is destined for export to neighboring Thailand.

However, In May 2009, Chinese Premier Wen Jiabao halted the construction of the Liuku dam on the Salween River in China's Yunnan province, calling for more thorough impact assessments.

Shweli River
The  Shweli I, II, III Cascade, in Shan State near the Chinese border, has also received significant Chinese support. Yunnan Machinery and Equipment Import and Export Co. (YMEC) began work on the Shweli I Hydropower Plant in February 2004 and, following the government's inability to secure funding, joined with Yunnan Huaneng Lancang River Hydropower Development Co. and Yunnan Power Grid Co. to create the Yunnan Joint Power Development Company (YUPD) in August 2006. For more information regarding the Salween River, see .

A few months later, YUPD assumed an 80% share in the project after creating the Shweli River I Power Station Co. together with Myanmar, turned the Shweli I dam into a Build-Operate-Transfer (BOT) project, and increased the installed capacity from 400 to 600 MW. At least two Sinohydro subsidiaries have provided construction services for the project, and Sichuan Machinery & Equipment Import & Export Co. and Ningbo Huyong Electric Power Material Co. have signed US$ multimillion contracts for electricity transmission cables and towers. The Shweli I Hydropower Plant is slated for completion by June 2009, and was half complete as of May 2007.

N'Mai, N’Mai, Mali and Irrawaddy Rivers
In Kachin State, several Chinese MNCs are involved in the construction of seven large dams along the N’Mai Hka, Mali Hka, and Irrawaddy River, with a combined installed capacity of  In 2007, China Power Investment Co. signed agreements with Burmese authorities to finance all seven dams, as well as with China Southern Power Grid Co. Yunnan Machinery & Equipment Import & Export Co. (YMEC) signed an MoU with Myanmar's Ministry of Electric Power in 2006 to develop the hydropower potential of the N’Mai Hka. However, details of this arrangement remain unclear. Changjiang Institute of Surveying, Planning, Design & Research has also completed a feasibility study at the confluence of the N’Mai Hka and Mali Hka.

Others
In western Myanmar, just inside the Indian border, runs the Chindwin River, where several potential dam sites have been identified that are likely to service export-oriented hydro-power plants. The sites include Thamanthi, Mawlaik, Homalin, and Shwezaye.

In August 2001, the Kansai Electric Power Company, or KEPCO, contracted with Myanmar to provide technical assistance for developing 12 hydro-power plants, including at least five sites on the Sittang River Yenwe, Khabaung, Pyu, Bogata and Shwe Gin.

China CAMC Engineering Co. has been involved in the surveying and implementation of hydropower projects in the region. The 790 MW Yeywa Dam in Mandalay Region, which began construction in 2006, is also being financed and constructed by several Chinese MNCs, including China Gezhouba Group Co., Sinohydro, China International Trust and Investment Co. (CITIC) Technology Co., ChinaNational Electric Equipment Co., China National Heavy Machinery Co., and Hunan Savoo Oversea Water and Electric Engineering Co. Additional financial backing for the project is being provided by the China EXIM Bank.

In addition to the Yeywa, Shweli and Hat Gyi projects, Sinohydro China's largest dam company and its subsidiaries have been involved in the Kun Creek-2, Kyauk, Monechaung, Nam Hkam Hka, Paunglaung (upper & lower), Tarpein I, Thapanseik I, II, III, and Zawgyi I Dams. As with the Yeywa project, both CITIC and China EXIM Bank provided investment and financial backing for the Thapanseik Dam.

The Yunnan Machinery & Equipment Import & Export Co. (YMEC) has been one of the most active Chinese companies in Myanmar's hydropower sector. Since the 1990s, YMEC has been involved in more than 25 projects of varying size, including the Ching Hkran, Chinshwehaw, Dattawgyaing, Hopin, Kunhein, Kunlon, Kyaing Ton, Kyaukme, Laiva, Mepan, Nam Hkam Hka, Nam Myaw, Nam Wop, Nancho, Paunglaung, Upper Paunglaung, Shweli I, II, III Cascade, Watwon, Zaungtu, Zawgyi I and II, Zichaung, and N’Mai Hka River hydropower projects, as well as the Rangoon Dagon Substation. The extent of YMEC involvement in these projects, several of which are completed, is unclear, but appears to involve construction and some financing.

Lists of dams

Hydroelectric

Irrigation only

In addition there were at least 10 major irrigation dams completed during the period between 1962 and 1988.

See also
 List of power stations in Asia
 List of largest power stations in the world

Notes

References

External sources
Map of dams
 Photo Gallery of Dams from 1961 to 2004
historical background of the Ministry of Electric Power
Myanmar Future Projects 1. HYDRO
Completed and On-Going Projects - Hydropower

 
Myanmar
Dams